Kate Elizabeth Forbes (born 6 April 1990) is a Scottish politician and accountant who is serving as the Cabinet Secretary for Finance and the Economy since 2020. A member of the Scottish National Party (SNP), she has been the Member of the Scottish Parliament (MSP) for the Skye, Lochaber and Badenoch constituency since 2016. On 20 February 2023, Forbes declared her candidacy for Leader of the SNP and First Minister of Scotland. 

Born in Dingwall, Scotland, in 1990, Forbes was raised in India and Scotland and was educated at a Scottish Gaelic school, where she became fluent in the language. She earned a BA in history from Selwyn College, Cambridge, and then an MSc in diaspora and migration history from the University of Edinburgh. After completing her degree, Forbes worked for a short time in the Scottish Parliament as a researcher for SNP MSP Dave Thompson. She then went on to work for Oxfam Scotland before studying to become a chartered accountant and working for Barclays. Forbes was elected to the Scottish Parliament in the 2016 election and quickly emerged as a "rising star" within the SNP. As part of a reshuffle of Nicola Sturgeon's second government, she appointed Forbes as the Minister for Public Finance and Digital Economy, serving as the deputy to the Finance Secretary Derek Mackay. After Mackay resigned, Forbes was appointed Finance Secretary by Sturgeon. Her tenure has been dominated by the COVID-19 pandemic in Scotland, and its economic impact, and the ongoing cost of living crisis in the UK. Forbes has been on maternity leave since July 2022, with Deputy First Minister John Swinney acting in her capacity. 

Following the announcement of Sturgeon's intention to resign as Leader of the SNP and First Minister of Scotland, Forbes announced her candidacy for leader in the 2023 SNP Leadership election. Her leadership bid drew significant attention due to her membership in the Free Church of Scotland, an evangelical Calvinist denomination with socially conservative positions, and her religious views on sexual ethics, which includes moral opposition to sex before marriage, same-sex marriage, and most abortions, and stating that Isla Bryson is a "biological male who identifies as a woman". Forbes responded to the controversy by stating that "in a free society you can do what you want" and that she would not push for her personal moral positions to be legislated into law during her premiership.

Early life 
Kate Elizabeth Forbes was born in Dingwall in Ross and Cromarty, Scotland on 6 April 1990. She is the eldest of four siblings: her mother is a teacher and her father is an accountant. Her parents were missionaries for the Free Church of Scotland. She spent her early years in the village of Marybank, where her parents ran a small business. At the age of four, Forbes moved to India for three years, where her father worked for various religious charities to provide healthcare to people who could not afford it. Forbes' father later studied a PhD in the Indian Stock Exchange and managed hospitals, relying on charitable donations because he made no income.

She returned to Scotland and was taught in a Scottish Gaelic school, where she became fluent in the language. She returned to India when she was ten and studied at Woodstock School in the foothills of the Himalayas. Forbes returned to Scotland, this time in Glasgow, at the age of 15 where she attended a secondary school in the city before moving back to the Highlands to finish her schooling at Dingwall Academy.

Forbes attended Selwyn College in the University of Cambridge, graduating with a Bachelor of Arts in History in 2011. She then studied at the University of Edinburgh, where she gained a Master of Science in Diaspora and Migration History in 2013.

Forbes joined the Scottish National Party (SNP) in 2011, having previously been active in the party's youth wing the Young Scots for Independence.

Early career 
After graduating, Forbes worked in the Scottish Parliament in 2011 as a researcher for Dave Thompson, the SNP MSP for Skye, Lochaber and Badenoch. In February 2023, openDemocracy revealed her first, year-long job as a researcher was funded by Christian Action, Research and Education, which is known for its opposition to abortion and LGBT rights. 

Forbes went on to work for Oxfam Scotland as a campaigns and policy officer, where she focused on issues such as poverty, inequality, and climate change. Forbes later studied to qualify as a chartered accountant and worked at Barclays for two years.

Political career

Election to Holyrood 

In August 2015, Forbes was selected from an all-women shortlist by local SNP members as their candidate for the Skye, Lochaber and Badenoch constituency held by Dave Thompson who would not be standing at the next election. She was part of an SNP campaign to address the gender pay gap around employment in the Highlands. She was elected in the 2016 Scottish Parliament election, doubling the majority from her predecessor from 4995 to 9045.

Backbencher (2016–2018) 
As a backbencher, Forbes was Convener of the Scottish Parliament's Cross-Party Group on Gaelic. She served on the Scottish Parliament’s Environment, Climate Change and Land Reform Committee, the Standards, Procedures and Public Appointments Committee, the Health and Sport Committee and the Rural Economy and Connectivity Committee. She also served as Parliamentary Liaison Officer for Finance and the Constitution.

In 2017, Forbes launched The Final Straw, a national campaign to ban the use of plastic straws in Scotland. The campaign was supported by the Marine Conservation Society. Forbes wrote to all of Scotland's 32 councils to support the campaign, with Comhairle nan Eilean Siar being the first Scottish council to pledge to go plastic straw-free. Her campaign was successful after a ban of single-use plastic was introduced in August 2022.In March 2018, she delivered an entire speech to the parliament in Gaelic during a plenary debate on the language. She has spoken in favour of UNESCO Intangible Cultural Heritage status as a possible way to protect the language. She campaigned for local issues, such as increasing the number of foster carers in the Highlands, and raised concerns of a lack of teachers in specialist subjects in the Highlands. 

In May 2018, Forbes called on the government to let children practise religious belief in school without mockery, saying "I wanted to note that pupils should be allowed to explore, develop and understand the diversity of religious faith in Scotland, because if they can understand it in school you will hope that as they go through the rest of their life they will be tolerant of people who believe that things are different to them."

Forbes was awarded "One to Watch" at the 2018 Scottish Politician of the Year awards, having been nominated the previous year.

Deputy Finance Secretary (2018–2020) 
On 27 June 2018, she was appointed to the Scottish Government as Minister for Public Finance and Digital Economy, as part of a wider reshuffle announced by First Minister, Nicola Sturgeon. She supported the Cabinet Secretary for Finance, Economy and Fair Work. 

In September 2018, The David Hume Institute reported that the government had made "no progress" on improving productivity in workplaces; Forbes commented that "over the last decade, productivity in Scotland has grown at more than three times the rate it has across the UK as a whole". In 2018, Forbes reiterated the SNP's committment to 100 per cent broadband coverage throughout Scotland; the original 2021 completion target was later put back. Forbes opposed the proposal to devolve business rates to Scottish councils.

2020 Scottish Budget 

On 6 February 2020, the day of the 2020 Scottish Budget, Derek Mackay resigned as the finance secretary, after the Scottish Sun reported he had inappropriately messaged a 16-year-old boy on social media. Forbes was left to deliver the budget within hours of preparation. Prior to this, no woman had delivered a Budget in either the Scottish Parliament or Westminster. Due to the late delivery of the UK Budget, Forbes raised concerns of the impact this would have on the passing of the Scottish Budget and told the Scottish Parliament there would be a very brief period for MSPs to scrutinise it.

In the budget, she announced there would be no changes to income tax rates and that the threshold for upper rates will be frozen, calling it the "fairest and most progressive income tax system in the UK".

Cabinet Secretary for Finance (2020–present) 
On 17 February 2020, Forbes was appointed Cabinet Secretary for Finance—the first woman to hold the post. In the 2021 Scottish Parliament election, she was re-elected with a majority of 15,681 votes, 7,000 more than in the previous election. Sturgeon formed her third administration and re-appointed Forbes as Finance Secretary, with economy added to her portfolio, as Cabinet Secretary for Finance and the Economy.

In July 2022, John Swinney took on responsibility for the Finance and Economy portfolio as Forbes went on maternity leave. She is the first Cabinet Secretary in the Scottish Government to take maternity leave.

COVID-19 pandemic 

During the COVID-19 pandemic, the Bank of England ordered a round of quantitative easing to keep UK borrowing affordable and interest rates low. SNP policy is that during the early years of independence Scotland would use sterling without a formal currency union and so would not have a central bank that could perform quantitative easing. In December 2021 Forbes responded to a query on this issue and posed the question, "Would it be such a great loss not to be able to conduct quantitative easing?" When the issue was raised at a session of First Minister's Questions, Forbes' query was labelled "economically illiterate" by Labour MP Ian Murray.

Ahead of Christmas 2021 Forbes delivered her budget in which she spoke of "very difficult choices" because of the "acute" problems posed by Covid. All 32 of Scotland's Council leaders wrote to the Scottish Government to complain about Forbes' £371 million cut in real terms to local authority funding. Cosla President Alison Evison said, "Many in the meeting described this settlement for local government as the worst they had seen. Council leaders were clear last night that we could not sit back and simply accept this and there was a real strength of feeling that enough is enough."

2022 Scottish budget 

In December 2021, Forbes introduced the 2022 Scottish budget, detailing the government's spending proposals amid the COVID-19 pandemic. It also outlined the recent election win pledges made by the SNP and the policies of the SNP-Green agreement.

Forbes laid firm her commitment to keep income tax rates the same, however, the budget increased the thresholds at which it is paid for low income earners. For Scottish Landfill Tax, standard rates and lower rates are set to be increased, while land and buildings transaction tax rates will remain at the same level. Forbes announced the council tax freeze, which was imposed last year, would come to an end. This gives councils in Scotland the ability to set their own rates for the first time since the SNP came into power in 2007. The budget set out £1.95bn to begin the delivery of the Adult Disability Payment, with a total £4bn funding into social security. This includes £197M to double the Scottish Child Payment, from £10 to £20.

2023 SNP leadership candidacy 

On 15 February 2023, Nicola Sturgeon announced her intention to resign the leadership of the Scottish National Party and First Minister of Scotland, which triggered a leadership election within the SNP to elect her successor. Forbes is considered a "rising star" within the party, although her religious views have been seen as an obstacle by some party members. She is a member of the Free Church of Scotland, an evangelical Calvinist denomination with socially conservative positions, such as opposition to abortion and same-sex marriage. Forbes has previously stated she "[makes her] own decisions" on issues "according to [her] faith, not according to the diktat of any church". 

Forbes officially launched her candidacy for leader on 20 February, stating she could not "sit back and watch our nation [be] thwarted on the road to self-determination.".  Forbes told STV News on 20 February that she would not have supported the Gender Recognition Reform bill in its current form and she does not support challenging the Westminster's government's Section 35 order stopping it, instead seeking negotiation with Westminster to agree changes to the bill. In an interview with the BBC, she declared that she would have resigned as finance minister over the GRR bill were she not on maternity leave at the time of its passage.

Following Forbes' comment that she does not support same-sex marriage, SNP MSPs who had previously supported her candidacy, including Richard Lochhead, Clare Haughey, Tom Arthur, Gillian Martin and Drew Hendry, withdrew their support. In a Twitter statement released on 23 February, Forbes expressed regret at the "hurt" her comments caused to her "friends, colleagues and fellow citizens". She pledged that she would "protect the rights of everybody in Scotland".

A poll released on 25 February 2023 suggested that 23% of Scottish voters preferred Forbes as first minister, compared to 15% who preferred Humza Yousaf and 7% who preferred Ash Regan. The same poll indicated that 20% of 2021 SNP voters preferred Forbes as first minister, compared to 18% for Yousaf and 9% for Regan.

Political positions 
Forbes has widely been described as socially and economically conservative, in contrast with the generally socially liberal policies of the SNP.

During her leadership campaign, Forbes received scrutiny of her religious and socially conservative views on abortion and LGBT rights. In an interview with STV News, she criticised the "illiberal" debate about her religious views and questioned the meaning of liberalism, stating "have we become so illiberal that we cannot have these discussions? Because if some people are beyond the pale then those are dark and dangerous days for Scotland.".

Scottish independence 
As a member of the SNP, she supports Scottish independence. During the 2021 Scottish Parliament election, Forbes told business leaders she wanted a second Scottish independence referendum to be held once the "immediate impact" of the pandemic was over. She has called for a restart of the SNP's independence strategy. She has considered Sturgeon's proposal of using a parliamentary election as a de facto referendum to be a way to apply pressure on the UK government to grant permission to hold a formal referendum "rather than it being necessarily a referendum in and of itself". She said she wanted to achieve independence by delivering economic growth. At the first hustings, Forbes said she would seek the "legal powers to hold a referendum" on independence within 3 months of the new UK general election.

Economic policy 
In 2018, Forbes was a member of the Sustainable Growth Commission, a blueprint of the economic policy and currency for an independent Scotland. The commission, which highlighted the more realistic approach to fiscal policy, proved unpopular among many left-wing SNP members for its embrace of liberal economics. The Institute for Fiscal Studies (IFS) stated it would "further austerity under the SNP Sustainable Growth Commission’s plans", while Common Weal, a left-wing pro-independence think tank, described it as shifting the Scottish economy to the right. Forbes supported the proposed currency arrangement of 'sterlingisation', which would mean an independent Scotland would not benefit from the central bank quantitative easing, a monetary policy of massive borrowing programmes during times of economic crisis.

As finance secretary, she stressed the need for more progressive taxation in order to tackle inequality and support economic growth. In March 2022, Forbes launched a report outlining Scotland's National Strategy for Economic Transformation, which is her plan to improve Scotland's economy over the following 10 years. 

In her official manifesto, Forbes put eradicating poverty at the heart of her economic policy with economic growth centre. OpenDemocracy claimed her economic agenda was "dangerous" and compared her economic policy to that of George Osborne and David Cameron, who oversaw a large-scale austerity programme in the early 2010s. Forbes stated the Scottish Government's proposed deposit return scheme would cause "economic carnage".

Social issues

Abortion 
In 2018, Forbes made a pro-life statement at a prayer breakfast, saying that the treatment of the unborn is a "measure of true progress" one day after a Westminster debate on abortion. In 2023, she said she "couldn’t conceive of having an abortion" herself, however, she "wouldn’t change the law as it stands". Forbes supports buffer zones for abortion clinics as she has said that women should not “be subjected to fear and harassment”.

Same-sex marriage 
On 20 February 2023, Forbes stated that if she had been an elected MSP in Holyrood when same-sex marriage was legalised in Scotland in 2014 she would have voted against the measure. However, in the same interview she clarified that she would not attempt to reverse existing same-sex marriage laws in Scotland.

Transgender rights 
Forbes has stated that she believes that a trans woman is a "biological male who identifies as a woman". She said a "rapist cannot be a woman" and that Isla Bryson, a transgender woman who was convicted of raping of two women prior to her gender transition, is "man".

In April 2019, Forbes was one of 15 SNP politicians who signed a public letter calling on the Scottish Government to delay its manifesto commitment to reform the Gender Recognition Act in Scotland. In January 2022, she told The Times that her position had not changed, that the Scottish Government should not rush to change the "definition of male and female" and said the Scottish Government "risked creating bad law". However, in the same month Forbes signed off the proposed bill in a Scottish Cabinet meeting and when later asked why she did so despite her concerns she refused to answer. She did not participate in the final vote on the Gender Recognition Reform (Scotland) Bill in December 2022 due to being on maternity leave. She later stated that she would not have supported the bill.

Electoral history

2016 Scottish parliamentary elections

2021 Scottish parliamentary elections

Personal life 
Forbes is a fluent Gaelic speaker.

She has been married to Alasdair "Ali" MacLennan since 2021. Forbes has three step-daughters, whom MacLennan had with his first wife, who died suddenly in October 2014. The couple have a daughter born in August 2022.

Religious views 
Forbes is a member of the Free Church of Scotland. In a BBC interview, Forbes stated that she has never tried to hide her faith, calling it "essential to my being", and argued that it does not affect her ability to serve all her constituents, saying "I have a duty to represent them" and that being honest about her faith is an important matter.

Views on premarital sex 
Forbes has stated that she is opposed to sex before marriage and childbirth before marriage, considering it "wrong according to [her] faith", however, she stated that "the birth of a child should still be celebrated". Forbes also stated that others have the choice to do so, as "In a free society you can do what you want".

Notes

References

External links 

 
 Profile on SNP website
 Personal website
 

1990 births
Living people
People from Dingwall
Alumni of the University of Edinburgh
Alumni of Selwyn College, Cambridge
Female members of the Scottish Parliament
Members of the Scottish Cabinet
Finance ministers of Scotland
Scottish National Party MSPs
Members of the Scottish Parliament 2016–2021
Members of the Scottish Parliament 2021–2026
Scottish accountants
Female finance ministers
Free Church of Scotland people